Luciano Lapetina (born 10 February 1996) is an Argentine professional footballer who plays as a left-back for Sarmiento de Resistencia.

Career
Lapetina's career began with Argentine Primera División side Godoy Cruz. He was an unused substitute two times for the club, once in the 2016–17 campaign against Newell's Old Boys and once in 2017–18 versus Racing Club. In June 2018, Lapetina joined Primera B Nacional side Deportivo Morón. His professional debut arrived on 4 November during a 1–1 draw away to Gimnasia y Esgrima. Lapetina signed for Torneo Federal A's Sportivo Las Parejas in August 2019. At the end of December 2021, Lapetina joined Sarmiento de Resistencia.

Career statistics
.

References

External links

1996 births
Living people
Place of birth missing (living people)
Argentine footballers
Association football defenders
Primera Nacional players
Torneo Federal A players
Godoy Cruz Antonio Tomba footballers
Deportivo Morón footballers
Sportivo Las Parejas footballers
Sarmiento de Resistencia footballers